Wwise (Wave Works Interactive Sound Engine) is Audiokinetic's software for interactive media and video games, available for free to non-commercial users and under license for commercial video game developers. It features an audio authoring tool and a cross-platform sound engine.

Description
The Wwise authoring application uses a graphical interface to centralize all aspects of audio creation. The functionality in this interface allows sound designers to:
 Import audio files for use in video games
 Apply audio plug-in effects
 Mix in real-time
 Define game states
 Simulate audio environments
 Manage sound integration
Apply the Windows Spatial Audio API, or Dolby Atmos.

Wwise allows for on-the-fly audio authoring directly in game. Over a local network, users can create, audition, and tweak sound effects and subtle sound behaviors while the game is being played on another host.

Wwise also includes the following components:
 Cross-platform sound engine (Wwise Authoring)
 Multichannel Creator (allows creation of multichannel audio)
 Plug-in architecture for source, effect, and source control plug-ins, part of Wwise Launcher
 SoundFrame API
Wave Viewer (allows for sampling of WAV audio files)

Supported operating systems
Wwise supports the following platforms:

Adoption by video games
Recent titles which have used Audiokinetic include:

Commercial game engine integration
Wwise is intended to be compatible with proprietary and commercial engines.
 Unreal Engine 3
 Unreal Engine 4
 Unity
 Cocos2d-x
 CryEngine
 Orochi 3
 Gamebryo
 Fox Engine
 Autodesk Stingray
 Open 3D Engine (which superseded Amazon Lumberyard)

Theatre
One play has used Wwise and its Interactive Music capabilities for live performance:
 Dom Duardos by Gil Vicente, co-produced by Companhia Contigo Teatro and Grupo de Mímica e Teatro Oficina Versus, with music by Pedro Macedo Camacho

See also 
 FMOD
 OpenAL
 Sound design
 Video game development

References

External links
 Alexander Brandon, "Audio Middleware, Part 2: More Contenders in the Emerging Field" Mix Magazine, 04-01-2007. Retrieved on 04-13-2007.

Audio libraries
Middleware
Video game development software
Video game development software for Linux
Video game music technology